"Whispers in the Dark" is a song by the Christian rock band Skillet, and it is the second single off their sixth album Comatose. The song has achieved a large amount of popularity in both the mainstream and Christian radio. From the album's release to the Winter Jam 2008 tour, the band opened their set with this song. For the Comatose Tour, this song was placed second in the set list. It has stayed there through the 2008 festival season before and in the 2009 Comatose tour. However the band started reopening their setlist with the song again for the "Awake and Alive Tour." It is the fourth single by Skillet to be released to physical media.

R&R magazine counted it as the No. 1 most played song in 2008 for Christian rock radio with 4,505 plays.

Track listing
 "Whispers in the Dark" (Edit) - 3:13

Music and lyrics
The song is based on a driving rock sound with heavy guitars (tuned in drop B tuning). It is written from the perspective of God, to humans, affirming that "you'll never be alone". This can be taken as a response to a previous track on the album, Falling Inside the Black.
Cooper said that the song is about feeling alone and looking around but nobody seems to be there- but God is there.

Music video
A music video was shot for this video at the same time as the video for "Rebirthing", and the two were released around the CD release at the same time. The "Whispers in the Dark" video consists of the band playing in a dark room filled with rain and rose petals (whereas the "Rebirthing" video takes place in a very bright room with windows looking out to the sky). The video includes a closeup shot of Ben Kasica's guitar solo, one of many that have been complimented at Skillet shows. It also includes lead singer and bassist John Cooper's popular trick of swinging his bass around himself and catching it again. Both videos have received play on Gospel Music Channel.

Video credits
 John Cooper - lead vocals, bass
 Korey Cooper - rhythm guitar, keyboards, backing vocals
 Lori Peters - drums
 Ben Kasica - lead guitar

Certifications

References

2006 singles
Skillet (band) songs
Songs written by Brian Howes
Songs written by John Cooper (musician)
Ardent Records singles
2006 songs
Lava Records singles
Atlantic Records singles